East Hyde is a village in the civil parish of Hyde, in the Central Bedfordshire district, in the ceremonial county of Bedfordshire, England.

East Hyde lies on the border with Hertfordshire.

Villages in Bedfordshire
Central Bedfordshire District